The Rats may refer to:
 The Rats (American band), a garage punk band from Portland, Oregon
 The Rats (British band), a rock band from Hull, England
 The Rats (2002 film), a television film
 The Rats (novel), a horror novel by James Herbert
 The Rats (video game), a text adventure survival game based on the novel
 Deadly Eyes, a Canadian film adaptation (released as The Rats in the United Kingdom)
 The Rats, the fictional backing group of Curt Wild in Velvet Goldmine
 The Rats, the 2009 revival of the Boomtown Rats
 A short story in the Argentine anthology film Wild Tales (film)
 The Rats (play), a five-act stage drama by Nobel laureate Gerhart Hauptmann

See also
The Rat (disambiguation)
Rat (disambiguation)
Las ratas (disambiguation)